Aestuariibacter salexigens is a gram-negative, halophilic, strictly aerobic, catalase- and oxidase-positive, rod-shaped, motile bacterium with a polar flagellum from the genus of Aestuariibacter which was isolated from sediment of getbol on the Ganghwa Island in Korea.

References

External links
Type strain of Aestuariibacter salexigens at BacDive -  the Bacterial Diversity Metadatabase

Alteromonadales
Bacteria described in 2004